The Veterans Memorial Bridge, commonly called the Orange Avenue Bridge, spans the Halifax River and Intracoastal Waterway in Daytona Beach, Florida, Volusia County, Florida. The bridge carries vehicles across two lanes of CR 4050 from Orange Avenue and Silver Beach Avenue.

History

First bridge
The first bridge at this location was built in 1899, connecting the then separate towns of Daytona and Daytona Beach.

Second bridge

Third bridge

Opened 6 August 2020, after four years of construction.

Memorial plaques
The bridge has 28 scenic overlooks, each with plaques commemorating conflicts in  the military history of the United States. Each plaque includes a description of conflicts and their outcomes; the number of military personnel killed, wounded, or missing in action; a QR code linked to additional data; and a Braille plate with information.

See also
 List of crossings of the Halifax River

References

Gallery

External links
 Veterans Memorial Bridge and Proposed Future Memorial Plaza at Volusia County's website
 Veterans Memorial Bridge at WSP Global
 Orange Avenue Bridge at bridgehunter.com

Bridges in Volusia County, Florida
Bridges over the Halifax River
Road bridges in Florida
Buildings and structures in Daytona Beach, Florida
Bridges completed in 2020
2020 establishments in Florida